Zsófia is a female given name, the Hungarian equivalent of Sophia, and may refer to:

 Zsófia Balla (born 1949), Romanian-born Hungarian poet and essayist
 Zsófia Bán (born 1957), writer, literary historian, essayist and art and literature critic
Zsófia Báthory (1629–1680), Hungarian noblewomen, mother of Francis I Rákóczi
 Zsófia Bosnyák (1609–1644), Hungarian noblewomen, wife of Count Ferenc Wesselényi
 Zsófia Csonka (born 1983), Hungarian sport-shooter
 Zsófia Dénes (1885–1987), Hungarian writer
 Zsófia Erdélyi (born 1987), Hungarian long-distance runner
 Zsófia Fegyverneky (born 1984), Hungarian basketball player
 Zsófia Földházi (born 1993), Hungarian modern pentathlon
 Zsófia Gottschall (born 1978), Hungarian biathlete
 Zsófia Gubacsi (born 1981), Hungarian former professional tennis player
 Zsófia Illésházy (1547–1599), Hungarian noblewoman
 Zsófia Kovács (born 1988), Hungarian professional triathlete
 Zsófia Kovács (born 2000), Hungarian artistic gymnast
 Zsófia Méray Horváth (1889–1977), Hungarian figure skater
 Zsófia Polgár (born 1974), Hungarian and Israeli chess player, teacher, and artist
 Zsófia Rácz (born 1988), Hungarian football player
 Zsófia Szamosi (born 1977), Hungarian actress
 Zsófia Torma (1840–1899), Hungarian archaeologist, anthropologist and paleontologist
 Zsófia Tóth (born 1989), Hungarian professional triathlete
 Sophia of Hungary (1050–1095), daughter of Béla I of Hungary
 Sophia (Coloman of Hungary's daughter) (1097–1100) the eldest known child of King Coloman of Hungary
 Sophia of Hungary (nun) (1136–1161) daughter of Béla II of Hungary 

Hungarian feminine given names